Xi'an LONGi Silicon Materials Corporation is a Chinese silicon producer. LONGi was established in 2000 and is the world's largest monocrystalline silicon producer.  Baoshen Zhong is LONGi's chairman.

In 2015, LONGi had an estimated capacity of 4.5 GW mono wafer.  That year, LONGi signed a contract with Yingli to cooperate on monocrystalline products.

In early 2016, LONGi signed a $1.84 billion solar panel sales agreement with SunEdison Products Singapore and agreed to purchase silicon manufactured in South Korea. LONGi also took over SunEdison's Malaysian silicon plant.

In 2017, LONGi Solar expanded module assembly capacity by around 1.5 GW to achieve 6.5 GW of nameplate capacity.

In early 2018, LONGi announced plans to build a new 5 GW module assembly plant in the Chuzhou Economic and Technological Development Zone in China's Anhui province, pending an internal review process, then an investment of approximately RMB 1.95 billion (US$300 million) and approximately 28 months of construction and start-up for manufacturing operations to commence.

References

Silicon wafer producers
Articles with dead external links from January 2018